Julia Rose Udine is an American theater actress best known for playing the role of Christine Daaé in The Phantom of the Opera on U.S. tour and on Broadway.

Biography 
Udine was born in Camden, New Jersey, on August 12, 1993, and grew up in nearby Voorhees Township. She graduated from Eastern Regional High School in 2011 and briefly attended Pennsylvania State University before moving to New York to train at the T. Schreiber Conservatory and later, the Broadway Dance Center.

While at Broadway Dance Center, Udine found a casting agent and auditioned for Jack's Back, an off-off-Broadway show, which she landed. Before she landed the lead role in The Phantom of the Opera, Udine auditioned and attended casting calls for many other roles.

From 2013 to 2014, Udine played the role of Christine Daaé in the U.S. national tour of Andrew Lloyd Webber's musical The Phantom of the Opera. She joined the Broadway cast on December 15, 2014.

A year later, Udine played Mabel in the New York City Center production of The Pirates of Penzance. Udine also starred in the one-woman Andrew Lloyd Webber musical Tell Me on a Sunday and Shrek the Musical at Philadelphia's Walnut Street Theater.

Udine's TV appearances include Law and Order: SVU and All My Children.

Performance credits

References 

1993 births
Musicians from Camden, New Jersey
Actresses from New Jersey
21st-century American actresses
Living people
Actors from Camden, New Jersey
Eastern Regional High School alumni
People from Voorhees Township, New Jersey